Daxing is a town under the administration of Tailai County, Heilongjiang, China. , it has one residential community and 9 villages under its administration.

References 

Township-level divisions of Heilongjiang
Tailai County